The Schleptruper Egge is a hill, 148 m high, in the Bramsche parish of Schleptrup and is part of the Wiehen Hills. Immediately east of the Schleptruper Egge runs the  A 1 motorway, the so-calle Hanseatic Line (Hansalinie).

On the top of the Schleptruper Egge is the mast of the NDR Osnabrück-Engter Transmitter. The long distance path of Hünenweg, managed by the Weser-Ems Wiehen Hills Society (Wiehengebirgsverband Weser-Ems), which runs from Osnabrück to Papenburg, also leads over the Schleptruper Egge.

Hills of Lower Saxony
Wiehen Hills
Osnabrück (district)